Khoya Khoya Chand is a Pakistani drama airing on Hum TV. It started airing on 15 August 2013, with a cast featuring Ahsan Khan, Sohai Ali Abro, Maya Ali and Yasir Shah in the lead roles.  The drama is based on Faiza Iftikhar's novel ‘Ye Lamhay Tere Naam Karein’. It has been directed by Faheem Burney and written by Faiza Iftikhar. It aired every Thursday from 8.00 pm on Hum TV.

Plot
Arib (Ahsan Khan) is an obedient and responsible son who loves his parents. He lives away from his hometown to pursue his job. Ahmareen (Maya Ali) is a college student who lives in a hostel near Arib's lodgings. Arib falls in love with her at first sight, but she leaves the hostel and returns home before he can approach her and confess his feelings. He searches for her, but without success. Considering his mother's ill health, Arib feels pressurised and agrees to marry Angabeen (Sohai Ali Abro), whom he has never met before. At the wedding ceremony, he discovers that Ahmareen is his wife's younger sister, but it is too late. 

Angabeen is equally unhappy with the marriage. Angabeen and her cousin Farooq (Yasir Shah) were in love with each other for years but could not marry because of conflicts between their families. Initially, both Arib and Angabeen struggle with their feelings. However, as time passes, they accept each other and grow closer. Arib discovers that Angabeen and Farooq were in love but shows complete trust in his wife and feels touched by her commitment to their marriage. The couple is expecting their first child, and their families are excited about it. However, their lives take an unexpected turn as Angabeen dies after giving birth to a daughter. After some time, both families decide to marry Ahmareen to Arib so the baby can grow up under a mother's care. On the wedding night, Arib confesses his feelings for Ahmareen. 

Ahmareen gets furious and concludes that Arib schemed to marry her after causing Angabeen's death through ill-treatment and neglect. She leaves the house before Arib can explain anything and disappears, taking the baby with her. Farooq helps Arib to track down Ahmareen and clears the misunderstandings between them. Ahmareen realises that she had overreacted and apologises. Arib and Ahmareen reconcile and begin a new life together.

Cast

Ahsan Khan as Arib
Sohai Ali Abro as Angabeen
Maya Ali as Ahmareen
Yasir Shah as Farooq
Ahsan Farooq
Manzoor Qureshi as Manzoor (Angabeen and Ahmreen's father)
Farah Nadeem as Azra (Ahmareen and Angabeen's mother)
Humaira Zaheer as Shama (Arib's mother)
Birjees Farooqui as Nazo
Esha Noor as Natasha

Soundtrack

The OST of the Series has been composed by Sohail Keys. It has been sung by Dua Malik, and Ahsan Khan, The Guitars have been done by Abid Wilson. The lines are frequently played during the show. The title song video is performed by Sohai Ali Abro and Maya Ali, Ahsan Khan and Yasir Shah. The OST Music is divided into two parts, "Open theme" and "End Theme". The Open Theme has been performed by Dua Malik while the End Theme has been done by Ahsan Khan. Both themes are further combined to make up the whole original OST. The OST of the Series is very popular and its full-length version has attracted many viewers.

Production
The series was based on Faiza Iftikhar's novel "Ye Lamhay Tere Naam Karein" and was produced by Faheem Burney. The Series cast Ahsan Khan, Sohai Ali Abro, Maya Ali and Yasir Shah as its main characters.

Making
The making of Khoya Khoya Chand started in June 2013, while the promos were shown during mid-July 2013. On 15 August 2013, the show aired its first episode, and ran for 18 episodes. On 26 December 2013, it aired its last episode, and was replaced by another TV series, Ru Baru.

Release

International broadcast
 It was also selected for the Indian Channel Zindagi and was aired from 12 November 2015.
 The show was selected to on air on Hum Europe from 28 November 2016 Monday to Thursday at 9pm.

Digital release
Khoya Khoya Chand is available for online streaming on Indian OTT platform Zee5 since July 2020.

References

External links 
 http://www.tv.com.pk/tvshow/Khoya-Khoya-Chand/177/story
 http://www.humtv.tv/blog/category/dramas/khoya-khoya-chand/

Hum TV original programming
Pakistani drama television series
Urdu-language television shows
2013 Pakistani television series debuts